João Pedro Ventura Medeiros (born 14 January 1994), known as João Ventura, is a Portuguese footballer who plays for Real S.C. as a forward.

Football career
Born in Rosário, Lagoa (Azores), Ventura started playing with local Operário, joining the club's youth system at the age of nine and making his senior debuts in 2011 in the third division. In the following year he signed for neighbouring Santa Clara, appearing in only three second level games in his debut season (38 minutes of action).

External links

1994 births
People from Lagoa, Azores
Living people
Portuguese footballers
Association football forwards
Segunda Divisão players
C.D. Santa Clara players
Ideal SC players
Real S.C. players
Sport Benfica e Castelo Branco players
Liga Portugal 2 players